Michael Carl Jones (born July 30, 1959) is a retired Major League Baseball pitcher. He played during four seasons at the major league level for the Kansas City Royals. He was signed by the Royals in the 1st round (21st pick) of the 1977 amateur draft. Jones played his first professional season with their Rookie league Gulf Coast Royals and Class A-Advanced Daytona Beach Islanders in 1977, and his last season with the Baltimore Orioles' Triple-A Rochester Red Wings in 1990.

References
, or Retrosheet, or Pura Pelota

1959 births
Living people
Baseball players from New York (state)
Burlington Expos players
Daytona Beach Islanders players
Fort Myers Royals players
Greenville Braves players
Gulf Coast Royals players
Indianapolis Indians players
Jacksonville Suns players
Kansas City Royals players
Major League Baseball pitchers
Nashville Sounds players
Omaha Royals players
Richmond Braves players
Rochester Red Wings players
Sportspeople from Rochester, New York
Tigres de Aragua players
American expatriate baseball players in Venezuela